Seru Uru (born 3 January 1997 in Lautoka, Fiji) is a Fijian-born Australian rugby union player who plays for the Queensland Reds in Super Rugby. His playing position is flanker. He has signed for the Reds squad in 2020.

Attended the prestigious Ratu Kadavulevu School with whom he won the U18 Deans Trophy in 2015 before being recruited to Rotorua Boys' High School in New Zealand where he won National title with their 1st XV. He is the son of Former Fiji 7's player, Tuidriva Bainivalu

Reference list

External links
Rugby.com.au profile
itsrugby.co.uk profile

1997 births
Fijian rugby union players
Living people
Rugby union flankers
Queensland Reds players
Brisbane City (rugby union) players